The 2013 Tippeligaen was the 69th completed season of top division football in Norway. The competition began 15 March 2013 and ended on 10 November 2013, when Strømsgodset defeated Haugesund 4–0 to win their second league title.

The league was contested by 16 teams: The best 13 teams of the 2012 season, Start and Sarpsborg 08 who won promotion from the 2012 1. divisjon and Sandnes Ulf who retained their spot in the top league after beating the 1. divisjon side Ullensaker/Kisa in the relegation play-off.

Molde who won Tippeligaen the previous season failed to defend the championship and ended on sixth place. Strømsgodset who won silver in 2012, won their first league championship in 43 years, finishing one point ahead of title contenders Rosenborg. Haugesund won bronze for the first time in the history, while Tromsø and Hønefoss were relegated to the 2014 1. divisjon.

Background

Molde, Strømsgodset and Rosenborg were involved in the title race in the 2012 season. After Rosenborg lost against the other title contenders Molde and Strømsgodset in the 27th and the 28th round respectively, Molde secured their second straight Tippeligaen title with one match left to play when Strømsgodset lost against Sandnes Ulf. Fredrikstad and Stabæk were relegated after finishing 15th and 16th respectively, while Sandnes Ulf had to play a relegation play-off against the 1. divisjon side Ullensaker/Kisa, which they won 7–1 on aggregate.

After the 2012 season, Rosenborg's head coach Jan Jönsson was fired from his position, and was replaced by the head coach of the successful Norwegian under-21 team, Per Joar Hansen. Jönsson was soon appointed as head coach of Aalesund, as a replacement for Kjetil Rekdal who had also been fired. Rekdal returned to his old club Vålerenga, which he won the league with in 2005. Martin Andresen had announced in October 2012 that he would leave his position as manager of Vålerenga after the season., In addition Per-Mathias Høgmo left Tromsø after his contract expired, and they appointed Agnar Christensen as the new head coach.

Season summary
Ahead of each Tippeligaen season, the newspapers in Norway predict how the season is going to end. In 2013, all of the major newspapers predicted that either Molde or Rosenborg would win the league. The opening match of the 2013 season was played between Viking and the defending champions Molde in Stavanger. Viking won the match 2–1 after a match-winning goal by Trond Olsen. Molde became the first defending champion in Norway to lose the first four matches of the season, with their manager Ole Gunnar Solskjær stating that the club wouldn't be able to defend the title. After collecting two points in the first seven matches, Molde won their first match 4–1 against local rivals Aalesund. Aalesund had an impressing season opener, by winning four of the first four matches, and after the loss against Molde they won 7–1 against Lillestrøm with Abderrazak Hamdallah scoring a hat-trick, and was positioned second after nine matches.

With Molde out of the race for the title, it looked as though it was going to be a fight between Strømsgodset and Rosenborg. Aalesund were, however, only five points behind the leaders Rosenborg, after they won three consecutive matches away from home, and with 10 matches left to play the players started to talk about winning the league. After Aalesund lost three matches in a row, the team was too far behind the top two teams, and three points behind Viking in third place. Aalesund went seven matches without winning, but with a record-high number of points the club finished the season in fourth place.

Tromsø, who finished fourth and lost the Norwegian Cup Final in the previous season, were the only Norwegian team to qualify for the 2013–14 UEFA Europa League group stage, but their form in the league after the summer break was declining, and they soon found themselves fighting against relegation. The team did however manage to put an end to Rosenborg's streak of 16 matches without losing, when Tromsø won 1–0 at home. After the loss at home against Start in the 25th round, Tromsø had collected six points in the last 12 matches and the club fired the head coach Agnar Christensen and replaced him with Steinar Nilsen, who had saved the team from relegation in 2005 and 2006.

For the first time since the 2005 season, the championship was determined in the decisive match of the season. Strømsgodset were leading the league one point ahead of Rosenborg, and could secure the championship in the home-match against bronze-winners Haugesund. At the same time, six teams were not safe from relegation with one match left to play; the three teams Sarpsborg 08, Tromsø and Hønefoss were fighting to avoid the two direct relegation spots, while Vålerenga, Sogndal and Sandnes Ulf could still be forced to play a relegation play-off against a 1. divisjon side if they finished 14th in the league. Rosenborg was leading 2–0 at half-time against Lillestrøm, and Strømsgodset needed to score a goal in their match against Haugesund to secure the title. Ola Kamara sent Strømsgodset up in a 1–0 lead, and after Stefan Johansen and Øyvind Storflor scored one goal each and  Ola Kamara scored his second goal in the game, Strømsgodset won the match 4–0 and secured their first championship since the 1970 season. Tromsø had to win the match away against Brann, who had nothing to play for in the last round, to avoid relegation but Tromsø had not won a single match away from home during the season, and also lost the last match 4–1, and were relegated to the 1. divisjon after an 11-year-long spell in the top flight. Hønefoss also had to win their last match to avoid relegation, and were leading the match against Odd, but Frode Johnsen scored the match-winning goal and Odd won 3–2. Sarpborg 08 lost the last match 2–1 against Viking, despite leading when the stoppage time began, and finished 14th in the league, and a met the 1. divisjon side Ranheim in the relegation play-off They won 1-0 at home and 2-0 in the awaygame and play in the next seasons Tippeligaen.

Johnsen's goal against Hønefoss was his sixteenth overall this season, and he became top goalscorer with one more goal than Aalesund's Hamdallah. Aged 38, Johnsen is the oldest-ever top goalscorer in the Norwegian top flight. Johnsen also won the Kniksen Award for the "forward of the year". Players from Strømsgodset won four of the five Kniksen Award prices as Adam Larsen Kwarasey won the goalkeeper of the year, Lars Christopher Vilsvik was named defender of the year, Stefan Johansen was the midfielder of the year and the head coach, Ronny Deila, won the "manager of the year" award.

Teams
Sixteen teams competed in the league – the top fourteen teams from the previous season and the two teams promoted from the 1. divisjon The promoted teams were Start and Sarpsborg 08 (both returning after a season's absence). They replaced Fredrikstad (ending their two-year spell in the top flight) and Stabæk (relegated after seven years in the top flight).

Stadiums and locations

Note: Table lists in alphabetical order.

Personnel and kits

League table

Positions by round

Relegation play-offs

The 14th-placed team, Sarpsborg 08, took part in a two-legged play-off against Ranheim, the winners of the 2013 1. divisjon promotion play-offs, to decide who would play in the 2014 Tippeligaen.

First leg

Second legSarpsborg 08 won 3–0 on aggregate and maintained their position in the 2014 Tippeligaen; Ranheim stayed in the 1. divisjon.''

Results

Season statistics

Top scorers

Source:

Top assists

Source:

Discipline

Player
Most yellow cards: 7
 Bismar Acosta (Start)
 Jørgen Horn (Strømsgodset)
 Magne Hoseth (Molde)
 Azar Karadas (Sogndal)
 Guðmundur Kristjánsson (Start)
 Petter Vaagan Moen (Lillestrøm)
 Þórarinn Ingi Valdimarsson (Sarpsborg 08)
Most red cards: 1
34 players

Club
Most yellow cards: 50  
Sarpsborg 08

Most red cards: 3
Brann
Haugesund
Molde
Odd
Rosenborg
Sandnes Ulf
Strømsgodset

Attendances

Awards

Annual awards

Player of the Year  

The Player of the Year awarded to  
Badou Ndiaye (Bodø/Glimt)

Goalkeeper of the Year 

The Goalkeeper of the Year awarded to 
Adam Larsen Kwarasey (Strømsgodset)

Defender of the Year  

The Defender of the Year awarded to  
Lars-Christopher Vilsvik (Strømsgodset)

Midfielder of the Year  
The Midfielder of the Year awarded to 
Stefan Johansen 
(Strømsgodset)

Striker of the Year  

The Striker of the Year awarded to 
Frode Johnsen (Odds)

Manager of the Year  

The Manager of the Year awarded to 
Ronny Deila (Strømsgodset)

References 

Eliteserien seasons
1
Norway
Norway